The Crouch End Hippodrome, originally the Queen's Opera House, was a theatre that once stood in Tottenham Lane, Crouch End, London.

The theatre opened in 1897 as the Queen's Opera House. It later became the Crouch End Hippodrome and subsequently a cinema. It was damaged by bombing during the Second World War and subsequently demolished apart from the front, which still stands in Topsfield Parade.

See also
The Queens, Crouch End

References

External links

http://www.theatrestrust.org.uk/resources/images/show/84-streetscape-showing-the-queen-s-opera-house-crouch-end-circa-1900

Former theatres in London
Crouch End
Former cinemas in London
Former buildings and structures in the London Borough of Haringey
History of Middlesex